Pelahiivka may refer to the following places in Ukraine:

 Pelahiivka, Donetsk Oblast
 Pelahiivka, Luhansk Oblast
 Pelahiivka, Mykolaiv Oblast